Thomas Paterson (born 1874, deceased) was a Scottish professional footballer who played as an outside right.

References
 

1874 births
Year of death unknown
Footballers from South Lanarkshire
Scottish footballers
Association football outside forwards
Motherwell F.C. players
Burnley F.C. players
English Football League players
Scottish Football League players
Abercorn F.C. players